The men's C-2 slalom competition in canoeing at the 2008 Summer Olympics took place between August 13 and 15, 2008 at the Shunyi Olympic Rowing-Canoeing Park in Beijing. The C-2 (canoe single) event is raced by two-man canoes through a whitewater course. The finals were rescheduled from the 14th to the 15th due to persistent lightning at the Park.

There were three rounds of competitions: the heats, the semifinal, and the final. In the heats, each canoeist completed two runs of the course. The time, in seconds, of each run was added to the number of penalty points assessed. Touching any of the 21 slalom gates resulted in a 2-second penalty for each gate touched, while skipping any of the gates resulted in a 50-second penalty. The total times for the two preliminary runs were summed to give a score for the heats. The top 12 boats advanced to the semifinals.

The semifinals consisted of a single run. The field was narrowed to the top 8 scores from that run; those 8 boats advanced to the final. The times from the final were added to the semifinal score to give an overall total.

Medalists

Schedule
All times are China Standard Time (UTC+8)

Results

References

ICF slalom canoeing schedule for the 2008 Summer Olympics. - accessed July 30, 2008.
Sports-reference.com 2008 men's slalom C-2 results

Men's Slalom C-2
Men's events at the 2008 Summer Olympics